The Newmarket Line is a railway line in Auckland, New Zealand, that runs between Quay Park Junction, near Britomart Transport Centre, and Newmarket Train Station. It is 2.64 km long. It connects the North Island Main Trunk (NIMT), which runs from the east into Britomart via the waterfront, and the North Auckland Line (NAL), which runs between Westfield Junction and Otiria via Newmarket and Whangarei. It has been named the Newmarket Line since 2011. From 1996 to 2011, it was named the Auckland–Newmarket Line, as it ran from Auckland Railway Station until the station closed in 2003. From 1977 to 1996, it was named the Newmarket Branch Railway.

Southern Line, Western Line and Onehunga Line services of the Auckland rail network travel on this line.

The Newmarket Line was originally opened in 1873 as the northern portion of Auckland's first railway to Onehunga via Penrose. It was part of the North Island Main Trunk Railway until the Westfield Deviation opened in 1930.

Since 1915, it has been fully double tracked after an upgrade of Parnell Tunnel north of Newmarket. Previous to that, it led as a single track section through a previous Parnell Tunnel.

In 2007, the major junction that connects the Newmarket Line with the North Auckland Line was rebuilt into a 'wye junction', removing the time-consuming reversing backshunt needed to access the NAL to the north from the Newmarket Line, thus giving the line better access to Britomart Station. This was part of a big upgrade of rail infrastructure in Auckland, and the Newmarket Station and Junction was included in the stage one electrification of the network.

A new station, Parnell, began operation on the line at the suburb of the same name on 12 March 2017 to serve the Western and Southern Lines of the city's train network, with an official opening on 13 March.

References

Bibliography 

 

Railway lines in New Zealand
Public transport in Auckland
Rail transport in Auckland